Shrikant Kalyani (born 21 August 1964) is an Indian former cricketer. He played first-class cricket for Bengal and Maharashtra.

He was named as head coach of Maharashtra cricket team for  2016-17 Indian domestic season replacing Australian David Andrews, who coached the side in the last two seasons. He also became the fifth Maharashtra coach in six years.

See also

 List of Bengal cricketers
 List of Maharashtra cricketers

References

External links
 

1964 births
Living people
Indian cricketers
Bengal cricketers
Maharashtra cricketers
Cricketers from Pune
Indian cricket coaches